Abdulah Skaka (born 5 December 1983) is a Bosnian politician and economist who served as the 38th mayor of Sarajevo from 2017 to 2021.

Since 2013, he has been a member of the Party of Democratic Action.

Early and personal life
Skaka was born on 5 December 1983 in Sarajevo, SR Bosnia and Herzegovina, SFR Yugoslavia, the oldest of six children to Dr. Uzeir Skaka (died 2015) and Amra. His paternal grandfather, also named Abdulah, was a co-founder of the Party of Democratic Action in 1990.

The Skaka family first arrived to Sarajevo around 1665, when his ancestor opened the cities first barber shop in the Stari Grad municipality. 

Since 2009, he has worked as the general manager of SKY Media company in Sarajevo. Skaka lives in Stari Grad with his wife and two children.

Political career
Skaka joined the Party of Democratic Action in 2013 and was elected by 16 out of the 28 members of the Sarajevo City Council to become the 38th mayor of the city on 6 February 2017, replacing Ivo Komšić.

In July 2019, he awarded former American senator Bob Dole the Key to the City of Sarajevo for his 96th birthday, inviting him to the visit the city again for his 97th birthday in 2020. After four years and following the 2020 municipal elections, on 8 April 2021, Skaka was succeeded by Benjamina Karić as mayor of Sarajevo.

Controversies
Skaka claimed to have graduated from the School of Economics and Business at the University of Sarajevo in 2011, although in October 2018 it was found that he actually attended the University of Travnik. He also been criticized for his lack of knowledge of regional politics and politicians, such as once claiming on television that Bosnian politician Stjepan Kljuić was the former Croatian president Stjepan Mesić, apparently confusing the two.

On 28 February 2020, it was revealed in a leaked recording that Skaka's election for Sarajevo mayor was not legitimate and that decisive votes had been bought. Publishing of the leaked recording resulted in a series of calls for his resignation or suspension, including petition by citizens, several calls for resignation or suspension by politicians or political parties present in the Sarajevo City Council, and by intellectuals.

References

External links

Abdulah Skaka at Facebook

1983 births
Living people
Politicians from Sarajevo
Bosniaks of Bosnia and Herzegovina
Bosnia and Herzegovina Muslims
Politicians of the Federation of Bosnia and Herzegovina
Party of Democratic Action politicians 
Mayors of Sarajevo